Skyler Wheeler (born April 24, 1993) is an American politician. A member of the Republican Party, he has served as member of the Iowa House of Representatives, representing the 4th district since 2017.

Wheeler finished first in a field of three candidates during a 2016 party primary. He was subsequently elected in a general election later that year to replace retiring Republican representative John Kooiker. He defeated independent candidate Jeff VanDerWerff in the general election, who had lost the Republican primary earlier that year. In his bid for a second term in 2018, Wheeler ran unopposed.

In the 2020 general election, Wheeler defeated Democratic Party candidate Björn Johnson.

In a 2022 primary, Wheeler survived a bid from Dordt University student Kendal Zylstra, winning 52% of the vote. Wheeler was initially based in Orange City and declared a bid in District 3, but instead chose to move to Hull, in District 4.

Electoral history

References

External links 
 Skyler Wheeler at Iowa Legislature
 
 Biography at Ballotpedia
 Campaign Website

1993 births
Living people
Republican Party members of the Iowa House of Representatives
21st-century American politicians
Northwestern College (Iowa) alumni
People from Orange City, Iowa
People from Hull, Iowa